Brikcha is a town in Ouezzane Province, Tanger-Tetouan-Al Hoceima, Morocco. According to the 2004 census it has a population of 1,510.

References

Populated places in Ouezzane Province
Rural communes of Tanger-Tetouan-Al Hoceima